"For All the Wrong Reasons" is a song written by David Bellamy, and recorded by American country music duo The Bellamy Brothers.  It was released in February 1982 as the first single from the album When We Were Boys.  The song was The Bellamy Brothers fifth number one on the country chart.  The single went to number one for one week and spent a total of twelve weeks on the country chart.

Charts

Weekly charts

Year-end charts

References

1982 singles
1982 songs
The Bellamy Brothers songs
Song recordings produced by Jimmy Bowen
Elektra Records singles
Curb Records singles
Songs written by David Bellamy (singer)